The 91/Perris Valley Line, formerly known as the 91 Line, is a commuter rail route operated by Metrolink that runs from Los Angeles to Perris in Southern California, paralleling State Route 91 between Riverside and Santa Fe Springs. Operating since May 2002, the route runs on the Southern Transcon line owned by BNSF Railway, as well as the Riverside County Transportation Commission-owned San Jacinto Branch Line. Services are primarily operated along the entire route between Union Station and Perris–South while some trips use Riverside–Downtown as a terminus.

History 

Service on the 91 Line began on May 6, 2002, between Union Station and Riverside–Downtown. Metrolink began operating limited weekend service on the 91 Line in July 2014.

Extension

The Perris Valley Line is a 24-mile-long extension of the original 91 Line into the Perris Valley. The extension runs on the San Jacinto Branch Line, which parallels Interstate 215.

The Riverside County Transportation Commission (RCTC) purchased the BNSF San Jacinto Branch Line in 1993, soon after Metrolink began operating. Planning for the extension formally began in 2002. After studying the service alternatives available for the Perris Valley, RCTC selected commuter rail service in 2004. The Federal Transit Administration provided funding for the extension in 2007.  In 2009, both the Federal Transit Administration and RCTC decided to conduct further studies into the project. The Federal Transit Administration decided to require a Supplemental Environmental Assessment (SEA) to refresh the 2004 information and to obtain new public comment. RCTC had decided to prepare a full draft environmental impact report (EIR) to clarify concerns and address new station site options. The draft EIR was released for public comment on April 5, 2010, with the public comment period closing on May 24, 2010. The draft SEA was completed and the comment period for the SEA ended on January 6, 2011. As of October 2012, comments received on both the EIR and the SEA were under review.

Seven stations were originally planned by RCTC—five to open along with the extension, and two to be built in the future. In the April 2010 CEQA-mandated environmental impact report, three stations were dropped: the two future stations, one on the Cajalco Expressway near its junction with Interstate 215 in Perris and one in Box Springs within Riverside; and a station adjacent to UC Riverside, which was removed due to complaints by local residents. In response to these removals, RCTC officials stated that more stations could be built in the future if necessary. A local community group filed a CEQA lawsuit against the extension in 2011; the group and RCTC settled the suit in 2013.

Led by RCTC, construction on the extension began in October 2013. Originally planned to start in December 2015, public service on the extension was delayed to February 2016, then March 2016, then scheduled for sometime in the spring. The delay had been attributed to construction of the Perris–South station. After numerous delays, the extension opened June 6, 2016. Metrolink inconsistently uses the terms "91/Perris Valley Line" and "91 Line" to refer to both the extension and the entire rail line.

The extension was projected to cost $248 million with funding coming from the state, a $75 million grant from the Federal Transit Administration, and Measure A, Riverside County's special sales tax for transportation projects.

Future development
In 2005, an RCTC-commissioned study determined that extending the line to San Jacinto via an underused rail line owned by RCTC, and/or to Temecula via a brand-new trackage, would be feasible.

Construction of an infill station in Placentia is planned, but has been delayed due to a lack of cooperation from BNSF, who owns the right-of-way.

Stations
There are twelve (thirteen planned) stations on the 91 Line:

The stations at West Corona, North Main Corona, Riverside-La Sierra, and Riverside-Downtown are also served by the Inland Empire-Orange County Line; the station at Riverside-Downtown is also served by the Riverside Line.  Although the 91 Line follows the same route through Los Angeles County as the Orange County Line, the 91 Line does not stop at the Commerce station.

References

External links 

91 Line Schedule

Perris Valley Line at the Metrolink website
Perris Valley Line extension project website

Metrolink (California) lines
Public transportation in Los Angeles County, California
Public transportation in Orange County, California
Public transportation in Riverside County, California
Transportation in the Inland Empire
Transportation in Corona, California
Transportation in Fullerton, California
Transportation in Riverside, California
Buena Park, California
Norwalk, California
Santa Fe Springs, California
Perris, California
Railway lines opened in 2002
2002 establishments in California
Railway lines opened in 2016
2016 establishments in California
Atchison, Topeka and Santa Fe Railway lines